The 1981 Garden State Bowl, part of the 1981–82 bowl game season, took place on December 13, 1981, at Giants Stadium in East Rutherford, New Jersey. The competing teams were the Tennessee Volunteers, representing the Southeastern Conference (SEC), and the Wisconsin Badgers, representing the Big Ten Conference (Big 10). In what was the final edition of the game, Tennessee won 28–21.

Teams

Tennessee

The 1981 Tennessee squad was undefeated at Neyland Stadium but finished 2–4 on the road. The Volunteers lost to Georgia, USC, Alabama and Kentucky. They accepted an invitation to play in the Garden State Bowl against Wisconsin following their loss to Kentucky on November 21. The appearance was the first for Tennessee in the Garden State Bowl and their 23rd overall bowl appearance.

Wisconsin

The 1981 Wisconsin squad was 5–2 at Camp Randall Stadium, and 2–2 on the road to finish the regular season 7–4. The Badgers lost to UCLA, Michigan State, Illinois and Iowa. The appearance marked the fourth overall bowl appearance for Wisconsin and their first non-Rose Bowl Game.

Game summary
Tennessee drove 74-yards on their opening drive and Fuad Reveiz connected on a 22-yard field goal to give the Volunteers a 3–0 lead. On the following possession Wisconsin took a 7–3 lead after Jess Cole scored on a three-yard touchdown run. The lead was short-lived as Willie Gault returned the ensuing kickoff 87-yards to give Tennessee a 10–7 lead. The Volunteers extended their lead to 13–7 at the end of the first quarter after Reveiz connected on a 44-yard field goal. Tennessee extended their lead further to 21–7 at halftime after a 43-yard Steve Alatorre touchdown pass to Anthony Hancock and a successful two-point conversion in the second quarter. After a scoreless third quarter, the teams traded fourth-quarter touchdowns. The Badgers scored on Randy Wright touchdown passes to Jeff Nault and Thaddus McFadden and the Volunteers on a six-yard Alatorre run.

References

Garden State Bowl
Garden State Bowl
Tennessee Volunteers football bowl games
Wisconsin Badgers football bowl games
December 1981 sports events in the United States
1981 in sports in New Jersey